Saffire may refer to:
 Saffire (music), an Australian guitar ensemble
 Saffire – The Uppity Blues Women, an American blues ensemble
 Saffire (company), an American video game developer
 Bajaj Saffire, a scooter produced by Bajaj Auto
 Safire Theatre complex in Chennai, India

See also
Sapphire, a gem variety of the mineral corundum